Many Christmas stories have been adapted to feature films and TV specials, and have been broadcast and repeated many times on television. Since the popularization of home video in the 1980s, their many editions are sold and re-sold every year during the holiday shopping season.

Theatrical
Christmas-themed films which received a theatrical release.

A Christmas Carol adaptations

The Nutcracker adaptations

Christmas action films

Christmas horror films

Christmas Thriller films

Short films

Made-for-television and direct-to-video
These are films that were made for television (including streaming services), or for the direct-to-video or direct-to-DVD market.

Family

A Christmas Carol adaptations

Christmas animals

Children's

Adult/horror

TV series

Comedy

Fantasy/Superhero

Family

Children's

Drama

Romance

Adult/horror/thriller/crime

See also

 List of highest grossing Christmas films
 List of Christmas television specials
 Christmas by medium
 Santa Claus in film

References

 
Films
Lists of films set around holidays